"Hey Now (Mean Muggin)" is the first single from American rapper Xzibit's album, Weapons of Mass Destruction. The song was produced by Timbaland and his protégé, Nate "Danja" Hills, featuring vocals by American singer and songwriter Keri Hilson. Released on November 16, 2004 in North America, the song peaked at number 93 on the U.S. Billboard Hot 100. The song is on the soundtrack of the video game NFL Street 2.

Formats and track listings

CD single
"Hey Now (Mean Muggin)" (Explicit)
"Get Your Walk On" (Explicit)
"What You Can't See" (Explicit)

Charts

Release history

References

2004 singles
Keri Hilson songs
Music videos directed by Benny Boom
Song recordings produced by Danja (record producer)
Song recordings produced by Timbaland
Songs written by Keri Hilson
Xzibit songs
Songs written by Timbaland
Songs written by Xzibit
2004 songs